Luminaria is the sixth studio album by Ian Moore and was released in 2004 (see 2004 in music).

Track listing
All songs by Ian Moore, except where noted

"What I've Done" - 3:56
"Caroline" - 7:13
"New Day" - 3:24
"April" - 3:05 (Ian Moore, Bukka Allen, George Reiff)
"Kangaroo Lake" - 3:35
"Abilene" - 3:51
"Ordinary People" - 5:29 (Ian Moore, Spencer Gibb)
"Cinnamon" - 4:33
"Bastard" - 2:23
"Sir Robert Scott" - 2:51
"Susan" - 4:31

Personnel
Ian Moore
Chris Searles
J. J. Johnson
Nina Singh
George Reiff
Rob Jersoe
Bukka Allen
Derek Morris
Jay Clarke
Brian Standefer
Chris Dye
Will Sexton
Paul Brainard
Matthew Southworth
Chris Forshage
Kullen Fuchs

References

2004 albums
Ian Moore (musician) albums
Yep Roc Records albums